KRUX (91.5 FM) is one of New Mexico State University's two radio stations, located in Las Cruces, New Mexico, United States. Student-run and operated, it airs an eclectic mix of musical genres. KRUX was the first non-commercial educational FM station to go on the air in Las Cruces. Each spring semester, the station puts on a week-long festival known as KRUXfest which features local music acts.

External links
KRUX Website kruxradio.com official website

RUX
RUX
Radio stations established in 1989
1989 establishments in New Mexico